Neothorelia is a monotypic genus of flowering plants belonging to the family Capparaceae. The only species is Neothorelia laotica .

It is native to Laos in Indo-China.

The genus name of Neothorelia is in honour of Clovis Thorel (1833–1911), a French botanist, explorer and doctor. The Latin specific epithet of laotica means "of Laos", the place where the plant was found.
Both the genus and the species were first described and published in Bull. Soc. Bot. France Vol.55 on page 269 in 1908.

References

Capparaceae
Monotypic Brassicales genera
Plants described in 1908
Flora of Laos